Jean-Pierre Bellet (born 5 June 1932) is a French rower. He competed at the 1960 Summer Olympics in Rome with the men's eight where they came fourth.

References

1932 births
Living people
French male rowers
Olympic rowers of France
Rowers at the 1960 Summer Olympics
Rowers from Paris
World Rowing Championships medalists for France
European Rowing Championships medalists